Xestia verniloides is a species of cutworm or dart moth in the family Noctuidae. It was described by J. Donald Lafontaine in 1998 and is found in North America.

The MONA or Hodges number for Xestia verniloides is 10973.1.

References

 Lafontaine, J. Donald & Schmidt, B. Christian (2010). "Annotated check list of the Noctuoidea (Insecta, Lepidoptera) of North America north of Mexico". ZooKeys, vol. 40, 1–239.
 Lafontaine, J. Donald / Dominick, R. B. et al., eds. (1998). "Noctuoidea Noctuidae (part) Noctuinae (part - Noctuini)". The Moths of America North of Mexico, fasc. 27.3, 348.

Further reading

 Arnett, Ross H. (2000). American Insects: A Handbook of the Insects of America North of Mexico. CRC Press.

External links

 Butterflies and Moths of North America
 NCBI Taxonomy Browser, Xestia verniloides

Xestia